4-Hydroxy-2-alkylquinolines (HAQs) are a class of intracellular signaling molecules associated with iron chelation. HAQs are produced by various types of bacteria, such as Pseudomonas aeruginosa, and are involved in quorum sensing.

The overproduction of these molecules, with their pro-oxidative effects, leads to antibiotic properties.

References

Quinolinols